Jack Littlejohn (born 8 November 1991) is an Australian professional rugby league footballer who last played for the Salford Red Devils in the Super League. He previously played for the Wests Tigers and the Manly Warringah Sea Eagles in the National Rugby League.

Background
Born in Wagga Wagga, New South Wales, Littlejohn played his junior rugby league for the Wagga Wagga Brothers, before being signed by the Sydney Roosters.

Playing career

Early career
In 2010 and 2011, Littlejohn played for the Sydney Roosters' NYC team, before moving on to the Roosters' New South Wales Cup team, Newtown Jets in 2012. On 30 September 2012, he played in the Jets' 2012 New South Wales Cup Grand Final win over the Balmain Ryde-Eastwood Tigers. In 2013, he joined Randwick DRUFC in the Shute Shield, before joining the Canterbury-Bankstown Bulldogs mid-season and playing for their New South Wales Cup team. After impressing for the Bulldogs, he signed a 2-year contract with the Manly Warringah Sea Eagles starting in 2014.

2014
In Round 8 of the 2014 NRL season, Littlejohn made his NRL debut for the Sea Eagles against the Canberra Raiders. He made 5 appearances in the halves over the course of the season.

2015
On 3 August, Littlejohn signed a 1-year contract with the Wests Tigers starting in 2016.

2016
In the absence of regular halfback Luke Brooks, Littlejohn made his debut for Wests Tigers in round 1 against the New Zealand Warriors. He made 2 more similar appearances towards the end of the season.

2017
For the opening three games of the season, Littlejohn was named on the bench and played hooker when he took the field, covering for injuries to Jacob Liddle and Matt Ballin.

After an injury to halfback Luke Brooks, Littlejohn returned to the starting team in round 5. Coach Andrew Webster said, "He was one of our real leaders during pre-season training, the boys love having him around and enjoy playing with him. I’m extremely confident Jack will get the job done.".  On 17 November 2017, Littlejohn signed a 2 year contract with English side Salford after being told by The Wests Tigers that his contract would not be renewed for the following season.

References

External links
Salford Red Devils profile
Wests Tigers profile
NRL profile
Zero Tackle profile
SL profile

1991 births
Living people
Australian rugby league players
Manly Warringah Sea Eagles players
Newtown Jets NSW Cup players
Rugby league five-eighths
Rugby league halfbacks
Rugby league players from Wagga Wagga
Wests Tigers NSW Cup players
Wests Tigers players